Casado con hijos is a Chilean television series and remake of  the American tv show Married... with Children. It aired on May 2, 2006, and ended on October 15, 2008. At the moment it's aired on post-time schedule, which means, after one a.m.

It was produced by Roos Film and Sony Pictures Television International and aired on the Chilean channel Megavisión. Its running time was about thirty to forty minutes and had four seasons.

Casado con Hijos was the most watched sitcom in the history of Chilean television, some of its episodes reaching more than 40 points of rating.

Synopsis

The Larrain's are a particular Chilean family. They are characterized for being a bit lazy, watching television all day, being messy and with no hope of social mobility.

Tito met his wife Quena (a Coihueco native) when they were in high school. Quena ended up pregnant and had no other choice but to marry Tito. Tito is a hooligan of the soccer team Unión Española, just like Fernando Larraín, the actor who portrays him.

Tito's family used to have a lot of money, but they lost everything on the economic crisis of 1982. His family left the country and Tito stayed in Chile by himself. He never got into college because he had no money. It was then that he looked for a job and the only thing he could find was a position as a seller in a women's shoe shop, in a mall in Downtown Santiago called “El Conde del Calzado”. Now, after 19 years of marriage, he's still working in the same pathetic job.

Series overview

First season 
The First season Casado con hijos (Married with children) began on Tuesday, May 2, 2006, replacing the legendary Mr. Bean and concluded on Friday, September 29 of that year.
In adaptation, originally completed with only 25 chapters distributed Monday through Friday, but due to the success of the series in Chile, screenwriters and producers decided to make a Second Season.

Second season  
The Second season or simply Casado con Hijos 2 (Married with children 2) began on Monday, October 2, 2006 and ended on Friday, January 26, 2007. It is set one year after the ending of the last season, which is why the protagonists of the series have changed "looks" (except Tito Larrain, who looks the same).

Third season 
On Monday, March 12, 2007 began Casado con hijos 3 (Married with children 3), the third season.
The family changed their look again. The neighbours had a baby, Larrain had a new car, a 15-inch flat TV, and had a dog instead of a parrot.

Fourth season 
The fourth season of Casado con hijos (Married with children) is called: Casado con hijos: Estelar (Married with children: Stellar) and began broadcasting from Wednesday, July 16, 2008, in primetime at 22:00 hrs. The premiere of this season was successful, because it had an excellent following, being first of its schedule.
The plot of this season is in the first leg of Tito's house to dedicate himself to music, which leads to a family breakdown.

Characters
 Alberto "Tito" Larraín (Fernando Larraín): Tito likes beer and soccer, and loves putting his right hand between his legs when he is sitting in his favorite sofa. He's harsh, often lies, and is not very affectionate with his family. He's been working on a miserable job he loathes for almost 20 years
 María Eugenia "Quena" Gómez de Larraín (Javiera Contador): She is the careless mother of the family. She is Tito's wife, with whom he's been married for 19 years, and mother of Nacho and Titi. Quena has never cooked, washed clothes or kept the house clean. She would rather buy new clothes on sale than wash the clothes she already has. Quena dresses with bright and attractive colours, tight outfits and low-cut shirts.
 Ignacio "Nacho" Larraín Gómez (Fernando Godoy): He is the youngest son of the family. He is characterized by being the smartest of his family and for having good grades at school. Nacho is very unpopular with women due to his lack of charm and unappealing looks. His family often makes fun of him for this and for being a mama's boy. His character is popular for his peculiar "baile del limpiaparabrisas" (windshield wiper dance).
 María Fernanda "Titi" Larraín Gómez (Dayana Amigo): Titi, the older daughter is 19 years old but has the maturity of a 13 year old and reads like a 6 year old. She is the most attractive out of the family but she is very foolish and naive. Titi has had a lot of boyfriends during the series, even at times she has several at once. Her father is very protective of her and affectionately calls her Polillita (Little Moth).

Neighbours

 Marcia Durán (Carmen Gloria Bresky): She's the neighbor, and a good friend of Quena. She's egocentric and considers herself superior due to her job of financial management. Marcia has strong feminist ideas, and often argues with Tito for being a sexist. Marcia is also very hysterical and a control freak, and has sudden fits of rage towards her husband, whom she regularly abuses verbally and physically.
 Pablo Pinto (Marcial Tagle): Pablo is Marcia's husband, he's very submissive, so Tito is always trying to influence him, inviting to bars or soccer games. Tito calls him "Marcio" due to the control his wife has over his behavior. During the first season, Pablo is very shy and correct, but at the second season, he becomes vain and extroverted after a trip to Ibiza, he also gets a strong Spanish accent.
 Norma Pons (Renata Bravo): Neighbor of the family during the third season, she went to school with Quena and is now a real estate agent. She's an independent woman, although also a gossip and vicious person, she complains about the Larraín's low education and impoliteness. The Larraín's, on the other hand, make fun of her for being an old maid.

Pets
 Paco: The family parrot, Quena is the one to look after him. It lasted until the second season because he died.
 Campeón: Champion in Spanish. The family dog that appears in the third season. He's a mongrel, but the seller told Quena the dog was a German shepherd.

Job 
 Luis "Lucho" (Jaime Omeñaca): He is Tito's co-worker, and a good friend of him. Lucho is a womanizer who lives with his mother, who naively believes he's a virgin.
 Bárbara Correa (Josefina Velasco): She is Tito and Lucho's boss, she is very strict, and constantly undermines and looks down on Tito. In one episode, she fell in love with Nacho.

Song 
Soy casado, casado con hijos
Ni lo sueñes, es mucho el sacrificio
A mi esposa, la mandaría a trabajar

Y aunque me pase todo el día en la zapatería
Todo el dinero lo gasta mi familia
Soy casado, casado con hijos
No me envidien por favor
No me envidien

Translation into English:

I am married, married with children
Don't even dream it, it takes much sacrifice
I'd send my wife off to work
And though I spend all day at the shoe shop
All the money is spent by my family
I am married, married with children
Do not envy me, please
Do not envy me

External links
 Intro, second season.
 

Chilean television sitcoms
2006 Chilean television series debuts
2008 Chilean television series endings
Married... with Children remakes
Mega (Chilean TV channel) original programming
Chilean television series based on American television series
Spanish-language television shows